Kulama Gunama is a 1971 Indian Tamil-language drama film, directed by  K. S. Gopalakrishnan and produced by M. Aasam. The film stars Sivaji Ganesan, Jaishankar, Padmini and Vanisri. It is a remake of the 1968 Telugu film Thalli Prema. The film was released on 26 March 1971.

Plot 

Sivaji is a highly respectable man in his village. He works tirelessly for the welfare of his society and hardly spends time with his wife Padmini. Padmini has no child after many years of marriage. Jaishankar is Sivaji's younger brother and is in love with Vanisri, daughter of Nambiar, who is the owner of a grocery store. Nambiar adulterates almost all his products in his shop and sells them at high prices. People have no choice but to buy his stuff for their daily life as this is the only grocery shop in the entire village. Sivaji puts a stop to this by inaugurating a grocery shop owned by the village cooperative society, after which Nambiar begins to incur losses as people no longer buy from his shop. After knowing that his daughter is in love with Sivaji's brother, Nambiar plans to make use of this to separate the brothers. Sivaji is initially reluctant to this marriage, but agrees eventually after talking to Vanisri and learning about her good character. After their marriage, Padmini and Vanisri lead the family like non-biological sisters. Vanisri pays no heed to her parents who wanted a separate share for Jaishankar and herself. Their motive goes in vain. Both Padmini and Vanisri conceive at the same time and during the child birth, ironically, Vanisri's baby is stillborn. Unknown to Vanisri, Padmini gives her son to her. Nambiar persuades Jaishankar to ask for his family share and Sivaji is shocked to hear this. Sivaji, in an emotional climax, gives his brother 2 choices, either to choose him or his entire family wealth in a subtle way. In the end, it is revealed that Vanisri knows the fact that her son is indeed Padmini's and they all live together happily.

Cast 
Sivaji Ganesan as Chinnathambi
Jaishankar as Raja
Padmini as Seetha
Vanisri as Lalitha
M. N. Nambiar as Nallakannu
Nagesh as Kalimann
C. K. Saraswathi as Sengamalam
K. D. Santhanam as Villager
G. Sakunthala as Doctor
A. K. Veerasami as Villager
K. V. Srinivasan as Villager

Soundtrack 
The music was composed by K. V. Mahadevan, with lyrics by Kannadasan.

References

External links 
 

1970s Tamil-language films
1971 drama films
1971 films
Films directed by K. S. Gopalakrishnan
Films scored by K. V. Mahadevan
Films with screenplays by K. S. Gopalakrishnan
Indian drama films
Tamil remakes of Telugu films